Kloster Veßra is a municipality in the district of Hildburghausen in Thuringia, Germany.

Vessra Abbey (now an open-air museum)  was founded and supported by the Henneberg family and abandoned after the Reformation.  The church was used as a parish church until 1939 when it caught fire.  It also had a close association with the von Bibra family in the 15th century.

Literature and Film 
 Kloster Veßra - Begegnung mit der Vergangenheit, Documentary (2012), Directed by Robert Sauerbrey

References

External links
Website of the Verwaltungsgemeinschaft
Hennebergisches Museum Kloster Veßra
Photo tour of the Klosters by Thüringer-Landschaften.de

Hildburghausen (district)